The Belgian State Railways Type 5 was a class of  steam locomotives for local passenger service, introduced in 1880.

Construction history
The locomotives were built by various manufacturers from 1880 to 1881.
The machines had an outside frame with the cylinders and the Walschaert located inside the frame.

References

Bibliography

2-4-0T locomotives
Steam locomotives of Belgium
Standard gauge locomotives of Belgium
1B n2t locomotives
Railway locomotives introduced in 1880